Traynor may refer to:

 Traynor (surname)

First name

 Traynor Ora "Chief" Halftown (1917–2003), Native American entertainer

Fiction
 Carol Traynor, character in the TV series Maude
 John Traynor, criminal character in the 2003 film Veronica Guerin
 Joyner William "Willie" Traynor, main character in John Grisham's The Last Juror
 Steve "Jetlad" Traynor, a main character in the graphic novel Top 10: The Forty-Niners
 Traynor, a villain appearing in the British children's television series Timeslip

Business
 Traynor Amplifiers, a brand of amplifiers designed by Yorkville Sound

Places

Canada
Traynor, Saskatchewan. A small place located 130 kilometers (81 miles) west of Saskatoon.

See also
Trainer (disambiguation)